Brigitte Bosmans (born 29 May 1965) is a Belgian breaststroke swimmer. She competed in three events at the 1980 Summer Olympics.

References

External links
 

1965 births
Living people
Belgian female breaststroke swimmers
Olympic swimmers of Belgium
Swimmers at the 1980 Summer Olympics
Place of birth missing (living people)